The 1982–83 season was Manchester City's 81st season of competitive football and 63rd season in the top division of English football. In addition to the First Division, the club competed in the FA Cup and Football League Cup.

First Division

League table

Results summary

References

External links

Manchester City F.C. seasons
Manchester City